Manying Ip , known as Bess Ip, (born 1945) is a social historian and emeritus professor in Auckland, New Zealand, who has published on the identity of Chinese New Zealanders.

Early life and education 
Ip was born in 1945 in Guizhou. Her parents had moved to the Guizhou region to escape the Japanese invasion of Hong Kong. She undertook university study in Hong Kong, and then completed a PhD in the History Department of the University of Auckland in 1983, titled From Qing reformer to twentieth-century publisher: the life and times of Zhang Yuanji 1867–1959.

Work 

Ip's PhD thesis was published by Beijing Commercial Press in 1985, and she has continued to study and publish on the Chinese diaspora, especially in relation to the identity of Chinese New Zealanders and New Zealand relationships with Hong Kong, Taiwan and China. Ip was appointed to the Human Rights Commission in 2003. Ip is also a trustee of the Asia New Zealand Foundation Board.

Selected publications 

 
 
 
 
  Reprinted in 2013.

Awards and honours 
Ip was awarded a New Zealand Suffrage Centennial Medal in 1993.

In June 1996 Ip was made an Officer of the New Zealand Order of Merit for services to the Chinese community.

Ip was elected a Fellow of the Royal Society Te Apārangi in 2009. She is also a Fellow of the New Zealand Academy of Humanities.

Ip was made a Companion of the New Zealand Order of Merit for services to the Chinese community and education in the New Years Honours for 2018.

References 

Fellows of the Royal Society of New Zealand
20th-century New Zealand historians
Officers of the New Zealand Order of Merit
Companions of the New Zealand Order of Merit
Recipients of the New Zealand Suffrage Centennial Medal 1993
1945 births
People from Guizhou
University of Auckland alumni
Academic staff of the University of Auckland
Living people
21st-century New Zealand historians
Chinese emigrants to New Zealand